The Jade Emperor Pagoda (Vietnamese: Chùa Ngọc Hoàng;  name: Ngọc Hoàng Điện, 玉皇殿, "Jade Emperor Hall", French: Temple Da Kao) also known as the Phước Hải Tự (Vietnamese: Chùa Phước Hải; 福海寺, "Luck Sea Temple") is a Taoist pagoda located at 73 Mai Thị Lựu Street, District 1, Ho Chi Minh City, Vietnam. It was founded by a Chinese merchant named Liu Daoyuan (劉道源, Lưu Minh or Lưu Đạo Nguyên) a Cantonese migrant. It is also known from 1984 by the new Buddhist name Phước Hải Tự (福海寺, "Luck Sea Temple"). Then U.S. President Barack Obama paid a visit to the pagoda during his state trip to Vietnam on 22 May 2016.

References

Pagodas in Vietnam
Religious buildings and structures in Ho Chi Minh City